Ngovayang is an iron ore mining site in the department of Océan, South Region,  Cameroon. It is controlled by the Indian company Jindal Steel and Power.

History 

In November 2013, the Australian company Legend Mining sold the Ngovayang exploitation to the Indian company Jindal Steel and Power. The deal was sealed in August 2014.

Transport 

The Ngovayang mining lease straddles the main metre gauge Cameroon Railways.

Ports 

The port of Douala on the existing metre gauge line has draft of only 8.5m, whereas the proposed more southerly port of Kribi has a draft of 20m, assuming that it were available on an open access basis.  Indeed an agreement was signed between Sundance Resources and Legend Mining to this effect.

See also 
 Iron ore in Africa
 Railway stations in Cameroon

References 

Economy of Cameroon
South Region (Cameroon)